James C. Tsai  is a physician and scientist who serves as president of the New York Eye and Ear Infirmary of Mount Sinai. He also serves as the Delafield-Rodgers Professor of Ophthalmology at the Icahn School of Medicine at Mount Sinai and Chair of the Department of Ophthalmology at the Mount Sinai Health System.

Tsai published the first taxonomy of medication compliance and adherence barriers in patients with glaucoma, the initial paper describing the isolated-check visual evoked potential (icVEP) technology for patients with glaucoma, and one of the first studies evaluating the use of erythropoietin for neuroprotection in an animal model of glaucoma.

Biography

A 1981 graduate of Phillips Exeter Academy, Tsai received his B.A. in neuroscience, magna cum laude, from Amherst College in 1985, his M.D. from Stanford University School of Medicine in 1989, and his M.B.A. in 1998 from the Owen Graduate School of Management at Vanderbilt University. He served his residency in ophthalmology at Doheny Eye Institute at the University of Southern California, 1990-1993, his fellowship in glaucoma at Bascom Palmer Eye Institute, University of Miami, 1993-1994, and another fellowship in glaucoma at Moorfields Eye Hospital and the Institute of Ophthalmology, London, 1994-1995.

Former positions include Assistant Professor of Ophthalmology and Visual Sciences and Residency Program Director, Department of Ophthalmology and Visual Sciences at Vanderbilt University School of Medicine, as well as Associate Professor of Ophthalmology and Director, Glaucoma Division, Department of Ophthalmology, Edward S. Harkness Eye Institute, Columbia University College of Physicians and Surgeons.

Tsai then served as the inaugural Robert R. Young Professor of Ophthalmology and Visual Science and Chair, Department of Ophthalmology and Visual Science, Yale University School of Medicine and Chief of Ophthalmology, Yale-New Haven Hospital.

Research

Tsai's research includes the identification of neuroprotective molecules that can shield the optic nerve from damage without lowering intraocular pressure, evaluation of medical adherence and surgical outcomes in patients with glaucoma, and development of advanced vision testing techniques.

His more recent research includes the long-term safety and efficacy of the Ahmed Shunt versus the Baerveldt Shunt Implant, optimizing and enhancing medication adherence in patients with glaucoma, and understanding the role of inflammation in the pathogenesis and treatment of glaucoma.

Publications

Author of more than 100 peer-reviewed scientific articles and over 80 invited medical articles, book chapters, and textbooks, including the Oxford American Handbook of Ophthalmology and Medical Management of Glaucoma (4 editions). Tsai has served as editorial board member for 9 medical journals and manuscript reviewer for over 100 additional scientific publications.

His most cited journal articles are:

  (cited 373 times according to GoogleScholar )
 (cited 333 times according to GoogleScholar )
 (cited 310 times according to GoogleScholar)
 (cited 175 times according to GoogleScholar)
 (cited 194 times according to GoogleScholar)

References

External links
Mount Sinai Medical Center homepage
The Mount Sinai School of Medicine homepage
New York Eye and Ear Infirmary of Mount Sinai
Yale/YouTube interview with Dr. Tsai

American ophthalmologists
Amherst College alumni
Columbia University faculty
Icahn School of Medicine at Mount Sinai faculty
Living people
Vanderbilt University alumni
1963 births
Vanderbilt University faculty
Yale School of Medicine faculty